The changdao was a two-handed, single-edged Chinese sword. The term  has been translated as "long saber," "saber-staff," or "long-handled saber." During the Ming dynasty,  was often used as a general term for two handed swords. After Republican Era, the term miaodao is sometimes used to describe changdao due to similarity.

The  seems to have first appeared during the Tang dynasty as the preferred weapon choice for elite vanguard infantry units in the Tang army. It was described as having an overall length of seven feet, composed of a three foot long single edged blade and four foot long pole grip. Due to its considerable length and size it became one of the hallmarks of elite Tang infantry, who were often placed at the front of the army as spearheads against enemy formations. The Taibai Yinjing states:

In one army, there are 12,500 officers and men.

This version of the  seems to have lost favor after the Tang dynasty. The  reappeared again during the Ming dynasty as a general term for two handed single edged swords. It was viewed very positively as an effective weapon by Qi Jiguang, who acquired a Kage-ryū (Aizu) manual from Japanese wokou, studied it, and modified it for his troops and used its tactics against enemies on the Mongol border c. 1560. At the time Qi specified a sword length of 1.95 meters, similar to the Japanese ōdachi. Its handle was long, apparently slightly more than one-third of its total length, and its curve shallower than that of Japanese swords. Commanding up to 100,000 troops on the Mongol border, General Qi found the  so effective that up to forty percent of his commandos carried it; it stayed in service throughout the late Ming dynasty.  The  is often compared to the Japanese ōdachi or nagamaki which bear close resemblances and similarities to it.

See also
Ji
Miaodao
Ōdachi
Wodao
Zhanmadao

References

 
 

Blade weapons
Chinese swords